United Nations Security Council Resolution 151, was adopted on August 23, 1960, after examining the application of the Republic of Chad for membership in the United Nations, the Council recommended to the General Assembly that the Republic of Chad be admitted.

The resolution was adopted by all members of the Council.

See also
List of United Nations Security Council Resolutions 101 to 200 (1953–1965)

References
Text of the Resolution at undocs.org

External links
 

 0151
1960 in Chad
 0151
 0151
United